Agnel is both a surname and a given name. Notable people with the name include:

 (born 1965), Polish dancer, choreographer and art historian.
Agnel Gomes (born 1988), Indian footballer
Yannick Agnel (born 1992), French swimmer

See also
 Cime de l'Agnel, a mountain in the Mercantour
 Lake of the Agnel, a lake in the Mercantour
 Agnel (coin), medieval French coin